North Marion High School is a public high school and magnet school located in Citra, Florida. The school's athletic teams are known as the Colts and the varsity football team competes in the FHSAA Class 5A Division. The school colors are garnet and gold. The school currently serves 1,313 students in grades 9 through 12 (2018–19).

Notable alumni 

 Cortez Allen - collegiate/professional football player
 Greg Carr - collegiate/professional football player
 Rielle Hunter - filmmaker, had an affair with and conceived a child with 2004 Democratic Party vice-presidential nominee John Edwards.
 Jeremy McKinnon - musician
 Freddie Swain - collegiate/professional football player

References

External links 
 

High schools in Marion County, Florida
Public high schools in Florida
Educational institutions established in 1964
1964 establishments in Florida